Tryin' to Get the Feeling is the third studio album by singer-songwriter Barry Manilow, released in 1975. It featured the title track, "Tryin' to Get the Feeling Again", with other hits including "New York City Rhythm", "Bandstand Boogie" (the theme from the long-running ABC series American Bandstand) and the chart topping "I Write the Songs".  The album debuted on the Billboard Top 200 Chart on November 8, 1975, reaching number five in early 1976. The album was certified double platinum.

The Piano Player sculpture on the album's front cover was created by Italian artist Dino Bencini. Both front and back cover art were later parodied by Ray Stevens on the cover of his 1979 album The Feeling's Not Right Again, which contains the song “I Need Your Help, Barry Manilow.”

Track listing

Side one
"New York City Rhythm" (Barry Manilow, Marty Panzer) - 4:42
"Tryin' to Get the Feeling Again" (David Pomeranz) - 3:51
"Why Don't We Live Together" (Phil Galdston, Peter Thom) - 2:54
"Bandstand Boogie" (Charles Albertine, Barry Manilow, Bruce Sussman) - 2:49
"You're Leaving Too Soon" (Barry Manilow, Enoch Anderson) - 3:30
"She's a Star" (Barry Manilow, Enoch Anderson) - 4:16

Side two
"I Write the Songs" (Bruce Johnston) - 3:51
"As Sure as I'm Standing Here" (Adrienne Anderson, Barry Manilow) - 4:50
"A Nice Boy Like Me" (Barry Manilow, Enoch Anderson) - 3:58
"Lay Me Down" (Larry Weiss) - 4:20
"Beautiful Music" (Barry Manilow, Marty Panzer) - 4:32

CD Bonus Tracks
"I'll Make You Music" [Bonus Track on 2006 Remaster] (Adrienne Anderson, Barry Manilow) - 2:34
"Marry Me a Little" [Bonus Track on 1998 and 2006 Remaster] (Stephen Sondheim) - 3:38

Charts

Weekly charts

Year-end charts

Personnel
 Barry Manilow – lead and backing vocals, piano, rhythm track arrangements, string arrangements (3), "32 voices" (4)
 Alan Axelrod – keyboards
 Charlie Brown – guitar
 Sid McGinnis – guitar, pedal steel guitar (5)
 Steve Donaghey – bass
 Lee Gurst – drums, percussion
 Jimmy Maelen – bongos, congas, shaker
 The Flashy Ladies (Debra Byrd, Lorraine Mazzola, Monica Burruss) – backing vocals
 Ramona Brooks – backing vocals
 Ron Dante – background vocals
 Norman Harris – string arrangements (1, 8, 9), horn arrangements (9)
 Gerald Alters – horn and string arrangements (2, 7)
 Arif Mardin – horn arrangements (4, 11), string arrangements (6)
 T.G. Conway – arrangements (9) 
 Joe Renzetti – string arrangements (10)

Production
 Producers – Barry Manilow and Ron Dante
 Engineer – Michael DeLugg
 Recorded at Sigma Sound Studios (Philadelphia, PA) and Mediasound Studios (New York, NY)
 Mastered at Sterling Sound (New York, NY).
 Cover Design – Robert L. Heimall
 Photography – Lee Gurst

Certifications

References

1975 albums
Barry Manilow albums
Arista Records albums
Albums arranged by Arif Mardin
Albums produced by Ron Dante